Ambersham may refer to the following places in England:

North Ambersham, West Sussex, England
South Ambersham, West Sussex, England